Don't Be a Menace to South Central While Drinking Your Juice in the Hood: The Soundtrack is the soundtrack to Paris Barclay's 1996 film Don't Be a Menace to South Central While Drinking Your Juice in the Hood. It was released on January 9, 1996 via Island Records, and consisted of hip hop and R&B music. The album peaked at number 18 on the Billboard 200, number 3 on the Top R&B/Hip-Hop Albums, and was certified Gold by the Recording Industry Association of America on March 14, 1996 for selling 500,000 copies in the United States.

It spawned five singles: The Island Inspirational All-Stars' gospel song "Don't Give Up", the Lost Boyz' "Renee", Mona Lisa (singer) featuring the Lost Boyz "Can't Be Wasting My Time", Joe's "All the Things (Your Man Won't Do)", and The Isley Brothers' "Let's Lay Together".

Track listing

Notes
Track 5 contains a sample of "MC's Act Like They Don't Know" performed by KRS-One
Track 6 contains a sample of "A Love of Your Own" performed by Average White Band
Track 16 contains a sample of "Nuthin' but a 'G' Thang" performed by Dr. Dre featuring Snoop Doggy Dogg

Other songs
There are three songs did appear in the film but were not released on the soundtrack album:
"Food Fight", written by Gregory Jacobs, Teren Delvon Jones and E. Humphrey, produced by D-Flow Production Squad, and performed by Digital Underground
"U Can't Touch This", written by Stanley Kirk Burrell, Rick James and Alonzo Miller, and performed by Titus and Da Boyz
"Happy Birthday", written by Patty S. Hill and Mildred J. Hill

Charts

Weekly charts

Year-end charts

Certifications

References

External links

Hip hop soundtracks
1996 soundtrack albums
Albums produced by RZA
Comedy film soundtracks
Island Records soundtracks
Albums produced by R. Kelly
Albums produced by Erick Sermon
Albums produced by Clark Kent (producer)